Ningbo Zhicheng School International (NZSI) was established in 2010 by Chen Hui and is a part of the Ningbo Zhicheng School (宁波至诚学校), a Chinese private domestic boarding school established in 1996. 

From 2012 to 2014, NZSI was authorized by the International Baccalaureate Organization (IBO) to offer the International Baccalaureate Diploma Programme (IBDP). 

In 2014, the school was renamed International School of Ningbo (ISN), and in 2019, it was renamed Georgia School Ningbo after receiving accreditation from the Western Association of Schools and Colleges (WASC) and independent licensure from the Zhejiang Province Bureau of Education (GSN). The school uses American textbooks and primarily hires teachers from the United States. Cavon Ahangarzadeh is the founding Head of School and a permanent member of the school's Board of Directors.

Affiliations 

In 2010, NZSI gained authorization from the International Baccalaureate (IB) for the IB Diploma Programme. In 2019, Georgia School Ningbo was recognized by the education bureau of Jiangbei District of Ningbo city as an independent international school.

Structure 

GSN is modeled after top college preparatory schools in the United States. The AERO (American Education Reaches Out) curricular framework is followed by GSN. English, Mathematics, Science, and Social Studies are the four core areas of instruction. With the exception of foreign languages, all classes are taught in English. 

The College Board and Educational Testing Service (ETS) have authorized Georgia School Ningbo to offer PSAT/SAT and Advanced Placement (AP) examinations on-site to full-time enrolled students. Model United Nations is also an activity at Georgia School Ningbo (MUN).

References

External links 

 Ningbo Zhicheng School International Official Site 
 American Education Reaches Out (AERO) 
 United States Common Core State Standards 
 Western Association of Schools and Colleges (ACS WASC) 
 College Board 

International schools in China
International Baccalaureate schools in China
Private schools in China
Educational institutions established in 1996
1996 establishments in China